This was the seventh season of Barnes Football Club.

Athletic Sports
 Date: 20 March 1869
 Venue: Field belonging to J. Johnstone, White Hart, Mortlake.
 Committee: A. D. Houseman (starter), F. W. Bryant, R. W. Willis (judges), J. Westell, H. F. Wilkinson, F. W. Bryant, J. G. Webster
 Events: 100 yards race, 400 yards race handicap, one and a half mile walking handicap, 150 yards hurdles, one mile handicap steeplechase, high jump, high jump with pole, vaulting.

Notes

Barnes F.C. seasons
Barnes